Cleistesiopsis divaricata, the rosebud orchid or small spreading pogonia, is a terrestrial species of orchid native to the eastern United States from New Jersey to Florida.

References

External links
 
 
 Go Orchids, North American Orchid Conservation Center
 USDA Plants profile for Cleistes divaricata (rosebud orchid)

Pogonieae
Orchids of the United States
Orchids of Florida
Orchids of Kentucky
Orchids of Maryland
Endemic flora of the United States
Flora of the Southeastern United States
Flora of New Jersey
Flora without expected TNC conservation status